Ralph Bernal Osborne of Newtown Anner House, County Tipperary, MP (26 March 1808 – 4 January 1882), born and baptised with the name of Ralph Bernal, Jr., was a British Liberal politician.

Life
He was the eldest son of London Sephardic Spanish and Portuguese Jewish Parliamentarian Ralph Bernal, himself an MP, who died in 1854, and wife Ann Elizabeth (née White). The younger Bernal entered the military in 1831, as an Ensign of the 71st (Highland) Regiment of Foot. He later served with the 7th (Royal Fusiliers) Regiment of Foot, and finally left the army in 1844 with the rank of Captain.

He had already been elected to Parliament in 1841 as a member for Chipping Wycombe, in the Liberal interest, and later sat for Middlesex (1847–57), Dover (1857–59), Liskeard (1859–65), Nottingham (1866–68), and Waterford City (1870–74).

In the Railway Times of 21 June 1845 he is the first person listed in the provisional committee for the Leicester, Ashby-de-la-Zouch, Burton-upon-Trent and Stafford Junction Railway: Ralph R. Bernal Osborne, MP for Wycombe, address: Albemarle Street.  The railway was never built.

Beside being a Parliamentarian, he was also Secretary of the Admiralty.

Family
On 20 August 1844 he married Catherine Isabella Osborne (30 June 1819 – 20 June 1880), from an Anglo-Irish landed family , the daughter of Sir Thomas Osborne, 9th Baronet and Catherine Rebecca Smith, and on the same day he took her name and his name was legally changed by Royal Licence, becoming Ralph Bernal Osborne.

His two daughters shared his estate. His older daughter, Edith Bernal Osborne, married Sir Henry Arthur Blake; His younger daughter, Grace Bernal Osborne (d. London, 18 November 1926), married William Amelius Aubrey de Vere Beauclerk, 10th Duke of St Albans. His grandson was Osborne Beauclerk, 12th Duke of St Albans.

Sources
 Charles Mosley, editor, Burke's Peerage, Baronetage & Knightage, 107th edition, 3 volumes (Wilmington, Delaware, USA: Burke's Peerage (Genealogical Books) Ltd, 2003), volume 2, page 3031.

References

External links
 

1808 births
1882 deaths
Liberal Party (UK) MPs for English constituencies
Members of the Parliament of the United Kingdom for County Waterford constituencies (1801–1922)
UK MPs 1841–1847
UK MPs 1847–1852
UK MPs 1852–1857
UK MPs 1857–1859
UK MPs 1859–1865
UK MPs 1865–1868
UK MPs 1868–1874
Members of the Parliament of the United Kingdom for Liskeard
English art collectors
British people of Spanish-Jewish descent
British people of Portuguese-Jewish descent
Jewish British politicians
Members of the Parliament of the United Kingdom for Dover